Timarcha coarcticollis is a species of beetle in the family leaf beetles.

Timarcha coarcticollis was first described scientifically in 1873 by Fairmaire.

References 

Beetles described in 1873
Chrysomelinae
Beetles of Europe
Wingless beetles
Taxa named by Léon Fairmaire